The 1927 VPI Gobblers football team represented Virginia Polytechnic Institute in the 1927 college football season.  The team was led by their head coach Andy Gustafson and finished with a record of five wins and four losses (5–4).

Schedule

Players
The following players were members of the 1927 football team according to the roster published in the 1928 edition of The Bugle, the Virginia Tech yearbook.

References

VPI
Virginia Tech Hokies football seasons
VPI Gobblers football